The Staffroom is a 2021 Croatian drama film, the feature film debut of writer and director Sonja Tarokić. 

The film premiered at the Karlovy Vary International Film Festival in August 2021, and won the Big Golden Arena for Best Film almost a year later at the July 2022 Pula Film Festival, the event which serves as the Croatian national film awards.

Plot
Entirely set at an elementary school in Zagreb, a new school counselor Anamarija arrives and tries to navigate helping students with complicated and entrenched inner workings of the school, inevitably on a collision course with the headmistress Vedrana and an old history teacher in his sixties, Siniša.

Cast

 Marina Redžepović as Anamarija
 Stojan Matavulj as Siniša Jambrović
 Nives Ivanković as Vedrana
 Maja Posavec as Ivana
 Sandra Lončarić as Sanda

References

External links
 

2021 films
2021 drama films
Croatian drama films
2020s Croatian-language films